Susan McKeown (born February 6, 1967) is an Irish folk singer, songwriter, arranger and producer.

Early years
Susan McKeown was born on February 6, 1967, in Terenure, Dublin, Ireland. She briefly attended the Municipal College of Music, Chatham Row, Dublinnow incorporated into the Dublin Institute of Technology)as a teenager before abandoning a potential career in opera order to sing folk and rock. Together with John Doyle, McKeown formed The Chanting House in 1989. Mainly performing as a duo, they toured Europe with Donogh Hennessy and other musicians, playing original songs and traditional tunes. They released a cassette-only album titled The Chanting House in 1990.

Move to New York
Upon graduating from University College Dublin, McKeown was awarded a scholarship to attend the American Musical and Dramatic Academy in Manhattan. In 1990, with a bursary from the Arts Council of Ireland, she relocated to New York City. Doyle followed and they were soon to join forces with Seamus Egan and Eileen Ivers, with whom they recorded one live cassette and one track, "If I Were You" (a song penned by McKeown), which they contributed to the album Straight Outta Ireland in 1993.

Solo career
McKeown was a regular performer at the coffeehouse Sin-é along with emerging songwriters Jeff Buckley, Dorothy Scott, Gerry Leonard, Amy Correia, Jack McKeever and began writing more songs with encouragement from musician and producer Jimi Daley (featured in the documentary Amazing Grace: Jeff Buckley). With Chris Cunningham, Michelle Kinney, Lindsey Horner and Joe Trump, as "Susan McKeown and the Chanting House" McKeown performed at clubs such as Sin-é, Fez, The Bottom Line and the Bowery Ballroom, and recorded a cassette album,Snakes, in 1993. But it was the release of Bones in 1995produced by Daleythat garnered her international attention and launched her touring and recording career. The latter featured original songs with her take on a centuries-old keen (caoineadh) and an arrangement of Robert Burns' "Westlin' Winds", later recorded by Fairport Convention.

In 1997, she recorded three albums: her own Bushes & Briars (Alula); Peter & Wendy, the soundtrack to the Obie Award-winning Mabou Mines theatrical production of the same name, which was composed by Johnny Cunningham; and Through the Bitter Frost & Snow, a collaboration with bassist Lindsey Horner. At this time, she began to divide her work into albums of traditional music (Bushes and Briars, 1998) and singer-songwriter albums (Bones, 1995; Prophecy, 2002).

Around 1992, Scots fiddler Johnny Cunningham asked McKeown to be the singer of the songs he had begun composing for the New York theatre company Mabou Mines' production of Peter & Wendy. He composed the rest of the songs for McKeown's voice. They worked together on the show for many years, including performances at The Public Theater, New Victory Theater, Spoleto Festival, Berkeley Repertory, UCLA Geffen Theatre and Dublin Theatre Festival. In the late 1990s, McKeown and Cunningham formed a duo and started an annual winter tour of music and song from the Scots and Irish traditions. This resulted in their producing the album A Winter Talisman in 2001 with guitarist Aidan Brennan.

In 1997, Cunningham invited McKeown to perform on the album and PBS TV Special The Soul of Christmas with Thomas Moore. It was while working on this show that McKeown suggested to Cathie Ryan and Robin Spielberg the idea of recording an album of songs relating to motherhood, resulting in the Mother album (1999).

McKeown began producing, and contributed to the albums Lowlands (2000 Green Linnet) and Sweet Liberty (2004 World Village/Harmonia Mundi). The latter earned a BBC Folk Music Award nomination for her setting of an English Romani song with a mariachi band. Her second release for Harmonia Mundi's World Village imprint was Blackthorn (2006).

In December 2003, McKeown joined the klezmer band The Klezmatics onstage at the 92nd Street Y in Manhattan in a concert of songs they had composed to lyrics by Woody Guthrie. She has toured and appeared with The Klezmatics often since then, performing in Europe and across the U.S., including in Carnegie Hall in New York City and Disney Hall in Los Angeles. Together they recorded Woody Guthrie's Happy Joyous Hanukkah (2004) and Wonder Wheel (2006) which won a Grammy for Best Contemporary World Music Album.

In 2009, McKeown and Lorin Sklamberg, the lead singer of The Klezmatics, released Saints & Tzadiks (World Village/Harmonia Mundi), an album combining Yiddish and Irish songs.

McKeown devised and produced Songs from the East Village, a world music album of songs from the students, parents and staff of The East Village Community School in Manhattan which was released in September 2010.

In October 2010 she released the solo album, Singing in the Dark, an exploration of creativity and madness with lyrics from
poets who lived with depression, mania and addiction, featuring musical settings of lyrics
by Dalkey-born John Dowland, James Clarence Mangan, Nuala Ní Dhomhnaill, Gwendolyn Brooks, Anne Sexton, Gwyneth Lewis and others, with music composed by McKeown, Leonard Cohen, John Dowland, Violeta Parra, and Klezmatics members Lisa Gutkin and Frank London.

McKeown was a 2012 recipient of The Arts Council of Ireland's Traditional Arts Bursary. 

In November 2012 she released Belong, her third album of original song. ‘Everything We Had Was Good’ - a duet with James Maddock - reached #1 on the American Folk Music Chart and the album reached #11 . A video for ‘On the Bridge to Williamsburg’, a duet with Declan O’Rourke, was released in November 2014.

In February 2018, she was IrishCentral's 'Anam' Award recipient for "discovering and revealing the soul of Irish song". Later in 2018, McKeown was Music Network Ireland's musician-in-residence at Dún Laoghaire LexIcon Library during which she researched the lives of extraordinary Irish women from the county whose stories were little known and composed and performed songs about them.

In January 2020, she wrote and performed original songs in Honor Molloy's 'Round Room' as part of New York-based Origin Theatre Company's 1st Irish Theatre Festival.

McKeown is the founder and director of Cuala Foundation.

Discography

 The Chanting House (1990) – cassette only
 The Chanting House – Live (1992) – cassette only
 Bones (1995)
 Peter and Wendy (1997), with Johnny Cunningham, Seamus Egan, Karen Kandel and Jamshied Sharifi
 The Soul of Christmas: A Celtic Music Celebration (1997) by Thomas Moore and Johnny Cunningham
 Through the Bitter Frost & Snow (1997), with Lindsey Horner
 Mighty Rain (1998) with Lindsey Horner
 Bushes and Briars (1998)
 Mother: Songs Celebrating Mothers & Motherhood (1999), with Cathie Ryan and Robin Spielberg
 Lowlands (2000)
 A Winter Talisman (2001), with Johnny Cunningham
 Prophecy (2002) Guest appearance by Natalie Merchant
 Sweet Liberty (2004)
 Woody Guthrie's Happy Joyous Hanukkah (2004 limited issue, reissued 2006 with 4 additional tracks) by The Klezmatics 
 Blackthorn: Irish Love Songs (2006)
 Wonder Wheel (2006) by The Klezmatics
 Saints & Tzadiks (2009) with Lorin Sklamberg
 Songs from the East Village (2010) – production only
 Singing in the Dark (2010)
 Belong (2012)

References

1967 births
Irish women singers
Irish folk singers
Living people
Musicians from Dublin (city)
Green Linnet Records artists
American Musical and Dramatic Academy alumni